Smialy may refer to:

Bolesław II Śmiały  (ca. 1041 or 1042–1081 or 1082), Duke of Poland
Śmiały (armoured train), Polish armoured train used by the Polish Army during the German Invasion of Poland in 1939